Dalbergichromene is a neoflavene, a type of neoflavonoid (a polyphenolic compound). Dalbergichromene can be extracted from the stem-bark and heartwood of Dalbergia sissoo.  It has also been synthesized from vanillin.

References

Neoflavonoids
Resorcinol ethers